Eric Seward (6 July 1891 – 11 October 1975) was a British swimmer. He competed in the men's 100 metre backstroke event at the 1908 Summer Olympics.

Seward was later a pilot with No 14 Squadron in the Royal Flying Corps in Palestine from 1916-1918. In 1917 the Martinsyde G.100 he was flying was brought down by Turkish anti-aircraft fire.    Seward swam four miles under enemy fire to an outpost of the Wellington Mounted Rifles Regiment, ANZAC. He was subsequently awarded the Military Cross. This was memorialized in a painting, The Seward Exploit, and is in the collection of the Imperial War Museum, RAF Section.

After retiring from the RAF he had a business career.

References

1891 births
1975 deaths
British male swimmers
Olympic swimmers of Great Britain
Swimmers at the 1908 Summer Olympics
Place of birth missing